The 1989 Spanish Open was a tennis tournament played on outdoor clay courts at the Real Club de Tenis Barcelona in Barcelona in Spain that was part of the Category 2 tier of the 1989 WTA Tour. The tournament was held from 25 April to 30 April 1989. Second-seeded Arantxa Sánchez won the singles title.

Finals

Singles

 Arantxa Sánchez defeated  Helen Kelesi 6–2, 5–7, 6–1
 It was Sánchez's 1st title of the year and the 3rd of her career.

Doubles

 Jana Novotná /  Tine Scheuer-Larsen defeated  Arantxa Sánchez /  Judith Wiesner 6–2, 2–6, 7–6(7–3)
 It was Novotná's 5th title of the year and the 17th of her career. It was Scheuer-Larsen's 1st title of the year and the 5th of her career.

References

External links
 ITF tournament edition details
 Tournament draws